Dil Toh Baccha Hai Ji is a 2011 Indian Hindi-language romantic comedy film directed by Madhur Bhandarkar, starring Ajay Devgn, Emraan Hashmi and Omi Vaidya in the lead roles with Shazahn Padamsee, Shruti Haasan, Rituparna Sengupta, Tisca Chopra and Shraddha Das in supporting roles. It is produced by Madhur Bhandarkar and Kumar Mangat under the banner of Bhandarkar Entertainment and Wide Frame Films. The film was released on 28 January 2011.

Plot
Dil Toh Baccha Hai Ji  revolves around the story of three men. Naren Ahuja (Ajay Devgn) works as a bank manager and is seeking divorce from his wife, Madhvi (Rituparna Sengupta); Abhay Suri (Emraan Hashmi) is a playboy and gym trainer; and Milind Kelkar (Omi Vaidya) works in a matrimonial company and is in search for true love. Naren leaves his house and starts living in his parents' house. Abhay and Milind are thrown out of their rented apartments and end up as paying guests for Naren. Naren has a crush on June Pinto (Shazahn Padamsee), who works as an intern in his bank. Milind starts loving a radio jockey, Gungun Sarkar (Shraddha Das). Abhay falls for Anushka Narang (Tisca Chopra), a former Ms. India, who married a multi-millionaire and is interested in young men.

Naren and June start enjoying each other's company. Milind tries to impress Gungun, which annoys her, but she uses Milind for her own reasons. Abhay gets full attention from Anushka and they start having an affair. The three love stories blossom until Nikki Narang (Shruti Haasan), the stepdaughter of Anushka, enters the story. Abhay falls for Nikki and starts ignoring Anushka. He breaks up with Anushka and starts going out with Nikki. June's grandma invites Naren for dinner, and Gungun eventually falls in love with Milind. The next day, everything changes. Milind gets upset after getting a letter from Gungun that she's going to Chennai for a movie, Nikki dumps Abhay therefore admitting that she was just using him for sex and he's not her type and June's grandma invites Naren to get his opinion on June marrying Chris Pascal, her boyfriend. At the airport, the three friends decide to go to Goa for a vacation and vow never to fall for girls any more. However, at the same airport they find three new girls. The story is the "love" defined in practical terms with satire.

Cast
Ajay Devgn as Naren Ahuja 
Emraan Hashmi as Abhay Suri 
Omi Vaidya as Milind Kelkar
Shazahn Padamsee as June Pinto
Shruti Haasan as Nikki Narang
Tisca Chopra as Anushka "Anu" Narang
Shraddha Das as Gungun Sarkar
Aditya Raj Kapoor as Harsh Narang
Rituparna Sengupta as Madhavi Ahuja (Naren's ex-wife)
Mukesh Tiwari as Mr. Mukesh Tiwari (Special Appearance)
Manoj Joshi as Waiter at Restaurant (Special Appearance)
Shikha Talsania as Aisha (Naren's assistant)
Arun Kadam as the flower seller
Sachin Parikh as Office colleague of Naren
Girish Sahdev as Office colleague of Naren
Daisy Irani as June's Nani
Neha Pendse as Neha Desai
Sanjay Chhel as Himesh
Sunny Singh as Akash (cameo appearance at airport scene)
Howard Rosemeyer as Jimmy
Dhruv Bhandari as Chris Pascal (June's boyfriend)
Chetna Pande as Priya (cameo appearance at airport scene)
Priya Marathe as Swati Paranjape (cameo appearance at airport scene)
Bhau Kadam as Dipak Sisodia (Cameo appearance)
 Shweta Salve as an item number

Rating
The film received an A (Adults only) rating by the Central Board of Film Certification after Bhandarkar refused to cut several scenes he felt were integral to the film.

Reception
The film received positive response from critics upon release. At the box office, it grossed Rs. 282.5 million in three weeks. The Indian theatrical rights were pre-sold at a reasonable price of 130 million. It collected around $250,000 in the first weekend from all overseas circuits.

Soundtrack

The songs of the film are composed by Pritam. Lyrics are penned by Neelesh Misra, Kumaar, Sanjay Chhel and Sayeed Quadri.

The film score is composed by Sandeep Shirodkar.

Track listing

References

External links

2011 films
2010s Hindi-language films
Films featuring songs by Pritam
Films directed by Madhur Bhandarkar